La Pintada  is a corregimiento and town in La Pintada District, Coclé Province, Panama. It is the seat of La Pintada District. Its population as of 1990 was 3,515; its population as of 2000 was 3,733.

The Coclé del Sur River runs along the edge of the town. Two kilometers from the town are located a variety of pre-Columbian petroglyphs.

The factory for the cigar brand Cigarros Joyas de Panamá is located in the town.  There is also a small artisans' market that sells Panama hats and various local crafts.

References

External links
Photo of the town's main square

Corregimientos of Coclé Province